The Feud and the Turkey is a 1908 American silent short drama film directed by D. W. Griffith.

Cast
 Harry Solter as Mr. Caufield
 Linda Arvidson as Mrs. Caufield
 Arthur V. Johnson as Colonel Wilkinson
 Robert Harron as George Wilkinson
 George Gebhardt as Bobby Wilkinson as an Adult
 Marion Leonard as Nellie Caufield as an Adult
 Gertrude Robinson as Nellie Caufield as a Child
 Florence Lawrence as Nellie Caufield's Sister
 Clara T. Bracy
 Edward Dillon
 Charles Inslee as Uncle Daniel
 Violet Mersereau
 Herbert Miles 
 Mack Sennett as A Member of the Wilkinson Clan

References

External links
 

1908 films
1908 drama films
Silent American drama films
American silent short films
American black-and-white films
Films directed by D. W. Griffith
1908 short films
1900s American films